is Misaki Iwasa's first solo single. Iwasa is the first member from AKB48 to debut as an enka singer. The CD was released as a regular and limited edition, with the former containing a DVD.

Track listing

Regular Edition

Limited Edition

References 

2012 singles
Songs with lyrics by Yasushi Akimoto
Misaki Iwasa songs
2012 songs